Senyukova is a rural locality (a village) in Leninskoye Rural Settlement, Kudymkarsky District, Perm Krai, Russia. The population was 17 as of 2010.

Geography 
Senyukova is located 41 km south of Kudymkar (the district's administrative centre) by road. Sidorova is the nearest rural locality.

References 

Rural localities in Kudymkarsky District